XL - Extra Large is a 2008 Indonesian movie. The film was written by Eric Tiwa & Monty Tiwa & directed by Monty Tiwa, and stars Jamie Aditya, Francine Roosenda, Dewi Sandra, and Alex Abbad. This film was released on February 2, 2008. This film producing by Starvision Plus.

Plot
Deni (Jamie Aditya) 25 year old honest and unsophisticated young man who goes along with his parents’ wish when they set him up to marry Vicky (Dewi Sandra), a well-educated, beautiful girl obsessed with sex. The situation pressures Deni to become the perfect husband that can truly be a match for Vicky. First, he has no sexual experience what so ever because he's still a virgin. Second, Deni's private parts are small.

With his friend's support, Deni goes to a legendary shaman that is rumored to be able to enlarge a male's private parts. But still he is relatively inexperienced in sex. With help from a friend, a pretty 
young prostitute is hired for the task. Deni slowly realizes that true happiness does not depend on physical perfection. In the end, a day before the marriage ceremony, Deni finds out that his main dilemma is not about the size of his private part. His problem is that he has fallen in love with Intan (Francine Roosenda), the good hearted prostitute.

References

External links

Indonesian sex comedy films
Films directed by Monty Tiwa